Charles Henry Frith (June 14, 1838 - December 19, 1912) was a Democratic Mississippi state legislator from Amite County in the late 19th and early 20th centuries.

Biography 
Charles Henry Frith was born on June 14, 1838, in Amite County, Mississippi. He was the son of William Frith and Amand (Simmons) Frith. Frith graduated from Georgetown College in 1859. He enlisted in the 6th Louisiana Infantry Confederate Army during the Civil War. He was a first lieutenant by the end of the war. During the war, he was captured and sent to Fort Delaware, where he was interned until the war ended. In 1895, he was elected to represent Amite County as a Democrat in the Mississippi House of Representatives, for the 1896–1900 term. In 1903, he was elected to the Mississippi State Senate to represent the 7th district, which was composed of Amite and Wilkinson Counties. He died in his home in Liberty, Mississippi, on December 19, 1912.

References 

1838 births
1912 deaths
Democratic Party Mississippi state senators
Democratic Party members of the Mississippi House of Representatives
People from Liberty, Mississippi
Confederate States Army officers